Arena of Fear is a 1959 Austrian drama film directed by Arthur Maria Rabenalt and starring Gerhard Riedmann, Margit Nünke and Willy Birgel.

The film's sets were designed by the art directors Alexander Sawczynski and Werner Schlichting. Location filming took place at the Circus Busch-Roland.

Cast

See also
Men Are That Way (1939)

References

External links

Austrian drama films
1959 drama films
Films directed by Arthur Maria Rabenalt
Films based on German novels
Circus films
Remakes of German films
UFA GmbH films
1950s German-language films